Cyclocheilichthys sinensis is a species of ray-finned fish in the genus Cyclocheilichthys.

Environment
Cyclocheilichthys sinensis is known to be found in a freshwater environment within a benthopelagic range. This species is native to a subtropical climate.

Size
Cyclocheilichthys sinensis has the maximum recorded length of about 31.5 centimeters or about 12.4 inches as an unsexed male. The common length of  Cyclocheilichthys sinensis as an unsexed male is 12.4 centimeters or about 9.44 inches.

Distribution
Cyclocheilichthys sinensis is native to Asia.

References

Footnotes 
 

sinensis
Taxa named by Pieter Bleeker 
Fish described in 1879